Media in the Rochester, Minnesota area includes:

Print
The city newspaper is the Post-Bulletin, an afternoon paper which publishes Monday through Saturday.  The city magazine is the monthly Rochester Magazine.

Online
Med City Beat, an online-only news service, launched in 2014 and covers local government, business and culture.

Radio

FM radio

AM radio

NOAA All Hazard radio
162.475 MHz (ch. 4) WXK41 (ERP: 1 kW). Olmsted County SAME code is 027109.

Television

Rochester is on the fringe of the broadcast area of many Twin Cities radio and television stations, as well as the La Crosse/Eau Claire market.

The Rochester area is served by cable company Charter Communications.

References

Rochester, Minnesota
Rochester
Rochester, Minnesota